Larry Edward Guno (February 28, 1940 – July 17, 2005) was a lawyer, playwright and political figure in British Columbia. He represented Atlin in the Legislative Assembly of British Columbia from 1986 to 1991 as a New Democratic Party (NDP) member.

He was born in Aiyansh, British Columbia in 1940, the son of Augustus Guno and a member of the Nisga'a nation. Guno was educated at Simon Fraser University and the University of British Columbia. In 2000, he was an unsuccessful candidate in the federal riding of Skeena. He wrote the play Bunk #7 based on his experiences at a residential school. In 2005, Guno died at his home in Terrace at the age of 65.

References 

1940 births
2005 deaths
20th-century Canadian dramatists and playwrights
20th-century Canadian politicians
20th-century Canadian male writers
20th-century First Nations people
21st-century First Nations people
British Columbia New Democratic Party MLAs
Canadian male dramatists and playwrights
New Democratic Party candidates for the Canadian House of Commons
Nisga'a people
First Nations politicians